The G. K. Gilbert Award is presented annually by the Planetary Geology Division of the Geological Society of America for outstanding contributions to the solution of fundamental problems in planetary geology in the broadest sense, which includes geochemistry, mineralogy, petrology, geophysics, geologic mapping, and remote sensing.  Such contributions may consist either of a single outstanding publication or a series of publications that have had great influence in the field.  The award is named for the pioneering geologist G. K. Gilbert. This award is not to be confused with the G. K. Gilbert Award for Excellence in Geomorphological Research given by the American Association of Geographers, or the G.K. Gilbert Award in Surface Processes given by the Earth and Planetary Surface Processes Section of the American Geophysical Union.

Award winners

Source:

See also

 List of geology awards
 Prizes named after people

References

Geological Society of America
Geology awards
Awards established in 1983
American awards
Planetary geology